Leukotriene B4 (LTB4) is a leukotriene involved in inflammation. It has been shown to promote insulin resistance in obese mice.

Biochemistry
Leukotriene B4 (LTB4) is a leukotriene involved in inflammation. It is produced from leukocytes in response to inflammatory mediators and is able to induce the adhesion and activation of leukocytes on the endothelium, allowing them to bind to and cross it into the tissue. In neutrophils, it is also a potent chemoattractant, and is able to induce the formation of reactive oxygen species and the release of lysosomal enzymes by these cells. It is synthesized by leukotriene-A4 hydrolase from leukotriene A4.

Diabetes 
A study at the University of California, San Diego School of Medicine has shown that leukotriene B4 promotes insulin resistance in obese mice. Obesity is the major cause of type 2 diabetes insulin resistance.

References

Eicosanoids